Ji-Hyun Lee is an American statistician whose research involves clinical trials, especially for the treatment of cancer.

Lee did her graduate studies in biostatistics at the University of North Carolina at Chapel Hill, where she earned a master's degree in 2000 and completed her doctorate in 2003. She joined the faculty at the University of South Florida in 2003, and in 2014 moved to the University of New Mexico as a professor of internal medicine and director of biostatistics in the UNM Comprehensive Cancer Center. Since 2018 she has been a professor of biostatistics at the University of Florida and director of biostatistics and quantitative sciences in the University of Florida Health Cancer Center.

Lee was president of the Caucus for Women in Statistics for the 2017 term, and in 2018 was elected as a Fellow of the American Statistical Association.

References

Year of birth missing (living people)
Living people
American statisticians
Women statisticians
UNC Gillings School of Global Public Health alumni
University of South Florida faculty
University of New Mexico faculty
University of Florida faculty
Fellows of the American Statistical Association